Zindakon (Russian and Tajik: Зиндакон) is a village in Sughd Region, northern Tajikistan. It is part of the jamoat Ayni in the Ayni District.

References

Populated places in Sughd Region